Sri Lanka is a tropical island situated close to the southern tip of India. The invertebrate fauna is as large as it is common to other regions of the world. There are about 2 million species of arthropods found in the world, and still it is counting. So many new species are discover up to this time also. So it is very complicated and difficult to summarize the exact number of species found within a certain region.

Ants
Phylum: Arthropoda   Class: Insecta
Order: Hymenoptera Family: Formicidae

Ants are social insects that can be found in terrestrial ecosystems. They are also very common in human settlements, as well as in forest floor. Well over 6000 species of ants were found and described, and new species are about to discover. Sri Lanka is home to 229 species of ants that included to 66 genera and 12 subfamilies. There are 102 endemic species in Sri Lanka, with 48.6% of endemism. One endemic genus Aneuretus is also included to the list. The following list is according to the Ants of Sri Lanka by Prof. R.K. Sriyani Dias 2014 comprehensive edition by Biodiversity Secretariat on Ministry of Environmental and Renewable Energy of Sri Lanka.

Subfamily: Amblyoponinae
 Stigmatomma testaceum

Subfamily: Aneuretinae
 Aneuretus simoni - Sri Lanka Relict Ant (endemic)

Subfamily: Dolichoderinae
 Dolichoderus taprobanae
 Tapinoma indicum
 Tapinoma melanocephalum
 Technomyrmex albipes

 Technomyrmex bicolor
 Technomyrmex detorquens
 Technomyrmex elatior
 Technomyrmex horni

Subfamily: Dorylinae
 Aenictus aitkenii
 Aenictus biroi
 Aenictus ceylonicus
 Aenictus gracilis
 Aenictus pachycerus
 Aenictus porizonoides
 Cerapachys coecus
 Cerapachys fossulatus
 Cerapachys fragosus
 Cerapachys luteoviger
 Cerapachys typhlus
 Dorylus orientalis

Subfamily: Ectatomminae
 Gnamptogenys coxalis

Subfamily: Formicinae
 Acropyga acutiventris
 Acropyga rubescens
 Anoplolepis gracilipes

 Camponotus albipes
 Camponotus auriculatus
 Camponotus barbatus
 Camponotus ceylonicus
 Camponotus greeni
 Camponotus fletcheri
 Camponotus indeflexus
 Camponotus irritans
 Camponotus isabellae
 Camponotus latebrosus
 Camponotus maculatus
 Camponotus mendax - ssp. integer
 Camponotus mitis
 Camponotus ominosus
 Camponotus rufoglaucus
 Camponotus reticulatus - ssp. yerburyi
 Camponotus sericeus
 Camponotus sesquipedalis
 Camponotus simoni
 Camponotus thraso - ssp. diogenes
 Camponotus varians
 Camponotus variegatus - ssp. infuscoides, intrans
 Camponotus wedda
 Dolichoderus taprobanae
 Lepisiota capensis - ssp. lunaris
 Myrmoteras ceylonicum
 Nylanderia taylori - ssp. levis
 Nylanderia vagabunda
 Nylanderia yerburyi

 Oecophylla smaragdina
 Paratrechina longicornis
 Plagiolepis pissina
 Polyrhachis aedipus
 Polyrhachis bugnioni
 Polyrhachis convexa - ssp. isabellae
 Polyrhachis curvispina
 Polyrhachis exercita
 Polyrhachis gibbosa
 Polyrhachis hippomanes - ssp. ceylonensis
 Polyrhachis horni
 Polyrhachis illaudata
 Polyrhachis jerdonii
 Polyrhachis nigra
 Polyrhachis punctillata
 Polyrhachis rastellata
 Polyrhachis rupicapra
 Polyrhachis scissa
 Polyrhachis sophocles
 Polyrhachis thrinax
 Polyrhachis tibialis - ssp. pectita
 Polyrhachis xanthippe
 Polyrhachis yerburyi
 Prenolepis naoroji
 Pseudolasius isabellae

Subfamily: Leptanillinae
 Leptanilla besucheti
 Protanilla schoedli

Subfamily: Myrmecinae
 Acanthomyrmex luciolae
 Anillomyrma decamera
 Calyptomyrmex singalensis
 Calyptomyrmex tamil
 Calyptomyrmex vedda
 Cardiocondyla emeryi - ssp. emeryi
 Cardiocondyla minutior
 Cardiocondyla nuda
 Carebara bruni
 Carebara butteli
 Carebara ceylonensis
 Carebara deponens
 Carebara diversa - ssp. taprobanae
 Carebara escherichi
 Carebara nana
 Carebara pygmaea
 Carebara sinhala
 Cataulacus granulatus
 Cataulacus simoni
 Cataulacus taprobanae
 Crematogaster anthracina
 Crematogaster apicalis
 Crematogaster biroi
 Crematogaster brunnescens
 Crematogaster consternens
 Crematogaster desecta
 Crematogaster dohrni - ssp. dohrni, gigas
 Crematogaster pellens
 Crematogaster ransonneti
 Crematogaster rogeri
 Crematogaster rogenhoferi
 Crematogaster rothneyi - ssp. haputalensis
 Crematogaster subnuda
 Dilobocondyla didita
 Lophomyrmex quadrispinosus
 Meranoplus bicolor
 Meranoplus boltoni
 Meranoplus levis
 Meranoplus loebli
 Metapone greeni
 Metapone johni
 Monomorium consternens
 Monomorium floricola
 Monomorium pharaonis
 Monomorium latinode
 Monomorium subopacum
 Monomorium taprobanae
 Myrmicaria brunnea
 Paratopula ceylonica
 Pheidole barreleti
 Pheidole ceylonica
 Pheidole diffidens
 Pheidole gracilipes
 Pheidole horni
 Pheidole latinoda - ssp. angustior, latinoda, peradeniyae
 Pheidole malinsii
 Pheidole megacephala
 Pheidole nietneri
 Pheidole noda
 Pheidole parva
 Pheidole pronotalis
 Pheidole rugosa
 Pheidole spathifera - ssp. yerburyi
 Pheidole sulcaticeps - ssp. sulcaticeps, vellicans
 Pheidole templaria - ssp. euscrobata
 Pheidologeton diversus
 Recurvidris pickburni
 Rhopalomastix escherichi
 Solenopsis geminata
 Solenopsis nitens
 Stereomyrmex horni
 Strumigenys godeffroyi
 Strumigenys inopinata
 Strumigenys lewisi
 Strumigenys lyroessa
 Strumigenys veddha
 Tetramorium bicarinatum
 Tetramorium curvispinosum
 Tetramorium pacificum
 Tetramorium pilosum
 Tetramorium simillimum
 Tetramorium tonganum
 Tetramorium tortuosum
 Tetramorium transversarium
 Tetramorium yerburyi
 Trichomyrmex criniceps
 Trichomyrmex destructor
 Trichomyrmex emeryi - ssp. laevior
 Trichomyrmex rogeri
 Tyrannomyrmex legatus
 Vollenhovia escherichi

Subfamily: Ponerinae
 Anochetus consultans
 Anochetus longifossatus
 Anochetus madaraszi
 Anochetus nietneri
 Anochetus pangens
 Anochetus yerburyi
 Bothroponera tesseronoda
 Brachyponera luteipes
 Brachyponera obscurans
 Centromyrmex feae - ssp. ceylonicus
 Cryptopone testacea
 Diacamma ceylonense
 Diacamma indicum
 Diacamma rugosum
 Harpegnathos saltator - ssp. taprobanae
 Hypoponera ceylonensis
 Hypoponera confinis
 Hypoponera ragusai
 Hypoponera taprobanae
 Leptogenys diminuta
 Leptogenys exudans
 Leptogenys falcigera
 Leptogenys hysterica
 Leptogenys meritans
 Leptogenys pruinosa
 Leptogenys peuqueti
 Leptogenys processionalis
 Leptogenys yerburyi
 Leptogenys peuqueti
 Mesoponera melanaria
 Myopias amblyops
 Myopopone castanea
 Odontomachus simillimus
 Pachycondyla luteipes
 Platythyrea parallela
 Platythyrea clypeata
 Pseudoneoponera rufipes

Subfamily: Pseudomyrmecinae
 Tetraponera allaborans
 Tetraponera nigra - var. insularis
 Tetraponera rufonigra

The following species were also described from Sri Lanka, but their true identities are currently unknown due to lack of experiments.

 Formica fuscicauda 
 Formica subpicea
 Myrmica obscurata
 Myrmica pilinodis

See also
 Ants of Sri Lanka, a book by Dr. Shriyani Dias

References

 https://web.archive.org/web/20140404120146/http://www.kln.ac.lk/science/antDB/
 http://www.lakdasun.org/forum/index.php?topic=1887.0
 http://www.antweb.org/
 http://www.antwiki.org/wiki/Sri_Lanka

Sri Lanka
 
Ants
Sri Lanka